Petrophile linearis, commonly known as pixie mops, is a species of flowering plant in the family Proteaceae and is endemic to southwestern Western Australia. It is a shrub with narrow egg-shaped leaves, the narrower end towards the base, and oval to spherical heads of hairy, greyish-pink or mauve to almost white flowers.

Description

Taxonomy
Petrophile linearis was first formally described in 1830 by Robert Brown in the Supplementum to his Prodromus Florae Novae Hollandiae et Insulae Van Diemen from material collected by Charles Fraser near the Swan River in 1826. The specific epithet (linearis) refers to the linear leaves.

Distribution and habitat
Pixie mops grows in woodland and heath on the coastal plain and Darling Range from Jurien Bay and Eneabba to Yallingup.

Conservation status
This petrophile is classified as "not threatened" by the Western Australian Government Department of Parks and Wildlife.

References

linearis
Eudicots of Western Australia
Proteales of Australia
Taxa named by Robert Brown (botanist, born 1773)
Plants described in 1830